Am haaretz (people of the Land) is a term found in the Hebrew Bible and (with a different meaning) in rabbinic literature.

Grammar
In Biblical Hebrew the word usually is a collective noun, but occasionally is pluralized as עמי הארץ amei ha-aretz "peoples of the land" or (in Late Biblical Hebrew) super-pluralized as עמי הארצות amei ha-aratzot "peoples of the lands". In Mishnaic Hebrew and later, the term refers to a single person: one such person is called an am ha-aretz, and multiple are amei ha-aretz. In Modern Hebrew the usual plurals are am ha-aretz and amei ha-aretz, but the super-plural amei ha-aratzot is occasionally used. In Yiddish and Yeshivish, it is often pluralized עמי הארצים amei ha-aratzim or עמרצים amaratzim.

Tanakh
In the Tanakh, the term "the people of the land" (Hebrew am ha'aretz) refers to a special social group or caste within the Kingdom of Judah. Among the activities of the biblical am ha'aretz was the revolt against Athaliah. By contrast, the plural ammei ha'aretz or ammei ha'aretzot refers to foreigners, either the nations of the world (gentiles) or the native Canaanite population living within Eretz Yisrael.

In the Second Temple period, the "people of the land" (am ha'aretz) are contrasted with those returning from the Babylonian captivity, "Then the people of the land weakened the hands of the people of Judah, and troubled them in building". It is unclear whether the term refers to the people of Judah who remained behind and adopted syncretistic views, or to non-Hebrews. Rubenstein (2003) considers that in the Book of Ezra and Nehemiah it designates the rural Jews who had remained in the land while the aristocratic and priestly classes were deported to exile in Babylonia. In the view of Kartveit (2009) the terms used in Ezra and Nehemiah may not be precise in their distinctions; there may be implication that the "people of the land" (Ezra 4:4) had intermarried with the "peoples of the lands" (Ezra 9:1 ammei ha'aretzoth), and there may be an equation or relation with the origin of the Samaritans.

Rabbinic Judaism

Usage of the term am ha'aretz in the Hebrew Bible has little connection to usage in the Hasmonean period and hence in the Mishnah. The Talmud applies "the people of Land" to uneducated Jews, who were deemed likely to be negligent in their observance of the commandments due to their ignorance, and the term combines the meanings of "rustic" with those of "boorish, uncivilized, ignorant".

In antiquity (Hasmonean to the Roman era, 140 BCE–70 CE), the am ha'aretz were the uneducated rustic population of Judea, as opposed to the learned factions of the Pharisees or Sadducees.

The am ha'aretz were of two types, the am ha'aretz le-mitzvot, Jews disparaged for not scrupulously observing the commandments, and the am ha'aretz la-Torah, those stigmatized as ignoramuses for not having studied the Torah at all.

The am ha'aretz are denounced in a very late and exceptional passage in Talmud Bavli Pesahim 49, where they are contrasted with the chachamim ("wise") and talmidei chachamim ("wise students", i.e. scholars of the Talmud). The text contains the rabbinical teaching that no man should marry the daughter of an am ha'aretz because if he should die or be exiled, his sons will then also be ammei ha'aretz (see Jewish matrilineality). A man should rather sell all his possessions in order to afford marriage to a daughter of a talmid chacham. Marriage of a talmid chacham to a daughter of an am ha'aretz is compared to the crossbreeding of grapevine with wild wine, which is "unseemly and disagreeable".

The am ha'aretz is often contrasted with the chaber - a term used to describe someone scrupulous enough in Jewish law (namely laws of ritual purity and tithes) for an observant Jews of Second temple times to eat by their house. It too later evolved into a term to describe Torah knowledge - in this case a high degree of it.

See also
 Diaspora Jew
 Ger toshav ("resident alien" in Hebrew)
 Goy (non-Jew in Hebrew)
 Hellenistic Judaism
 Heresy in Judaism
 Pagan
 Sabra
 Who is a Jew?
 Zera Yisrael

References

Sources
Mayer Sulzberger, The Am Ha-aretz, The Ancient Hebrew Parliament: A Chapter In The Constitutional History Of Ancient Israel (1910)
A'haron Oppenheimer, The ʻam ha-aretz: a study in the social history of the Jewish people in the Hellenistic-Roman period, vol.  8 of Arbeiten zur Literatur und Geschichte des hellenistischen Judentums, Brill Archive, 1977, .

External links
Am ha’aretz, by Rabbi Julian Sinclair, October 28, 2008.

Ethno-cultural designations
Hebrew words and phrases in the Hebrew Bible
Society of Israel
Jews in the Land of Israel